Sally Walker may refer to:

Sally Walker (academic), Australian academic
Sally Walker (song), by Iggy Azalea, 2019
Sally M. Walker, American author
Sally W. Walker, American politician